USS Wadsworth (Destroyer No. 60/DD-60) was a  built for the United States Navy prior to the American entry into World War I. The ship was the first U.S. Navy vessel named for Alexander Scammel Wadsworth.

Wadsworth was laid down by the Bath Iron Works of Bath, Maine, in February 1914 and launched in April 1915. She was armed with four  guns and had eight 21 inch (533 mm) torpedo tubes. Wadsworths geared steam turbine power plant was a successful prototype that greatly influenced U.S. destroyer designs after 1915.

After her July 1915 commissioning, Wadsworth served on the neutrality patrol off the east coast and in the Caribbean. After the United States entered World War I in April 1917, Wadsworth was the flagship of the first U.S. destroyer squadron sent overseas. Patrolling the Irish Sea out of Queenstown, Ireland, Wadsworth reported several encounters with U-boats in the first months overseas. She was transferred to Brest, France, in March 1918, and spent the remainder of the war there.

Upon returning to the United States at the end of 1918, Wadsworth underwent a five-month overhaul. She served as a plane guard for the Navy's transatlantic flight attempt by four Navy-Curtiss flying boats in May. After two years in reduced commission in August, Wadsworth was reactivated in May 1921. She was decommissioned in June 1922, and spent nearly 14 years in reserve at the Philadelphia Navy Yard. She was struck from the Naval Vessel Register in January 1936, sold in June, and scrapped in August.

Design and construction 
Construction of the vessel was awarded to Bath Iron Works of Bath, Maine, which laid down her keel on 23 February 1914. Fourteen months later, on 29 April 1915, Wadsworth was launched by sponsor Juanita Doane Wells. The ship was named after Commodore Alexander Scammel Wadsworth (1790–1851), a U.S. Navy officer during the War of 1812 and later the Navy's Inspector of Ordnance.

Unlike the rest of the Tucker-class ships—which had differing arrangements of steam turbines and reciprocating engines for cruising—Wadsworth was designed with what became the main United States prototype installation of her two Curtis geared steam turbines. According to Conway's All the World's Fighting Ships 1906–1921, the mechanical design for Wadsworth had a "considerable effect" on post-1915 U.S. destroyer designs.

Wadsworth was also equipped with eight  torpedo tubes. The General Board of the United States Navy had called for two anti-aircraft guns for the Tucker-class ships, as well as provisions for laying up to 36 floating mines. From sources, it is unclear if these recommendations were followed for Wadsworth or any of the Tucker ships.

Early career 

USS Wadsworth was commissioned into the United States Navy at the Boston Navy Yard on 23 July 1915 under the command of Lieutenant Commander Joseph K. Taussig. After trials and torpedo firing drills out of Newport, Rhode Island, the destroyer took up duty off the New England coast line in October. Her duty included patrols to insure America's neutrality vis-a-vis the year-old European war. On 7 January 1916, she departed Provincetown, Massachusetts, to join in the annual Fleet maneuvers in the Caribbean. After a stop at Norfolk, Virginia, she reached the West Indies at Culebra Island on 15 January and began a three-month round of war games, drills, and exercises. During her stay in the Caribbean, she visited Guantanamo Bay, Guacanayabo Bay, Manzanillo, and Santiago — all in Cuba. On 10 April, she left Guantanamo Bay to steam north, stopped at New York for a five-week stay, and returned to Newport on 21 May. Wadsworth resumed operations along the New England coast, and the succeeding year passed in much the same way as had its predecessor — summer operations along the northeastern coast followed by Fleet maneuvers in the Caribbean.

At the completion of her second round of winter Fleet maneuvers in the spring of 1917, Wadsworth returned north as far as Hampton Roads. As America's entry into World War I approached, she and her sister destroyers began patrolling the Norfolk–Yorktown area to protect the naval bases and ships there against potential incursions by German submarines.

World War I 

On 6 April 1917, while Wadsworth was at anchor with the rest of the Fleet at Yorktown, the United States entered World War I. Wadsworth moved to New York almost immediately to prepare for the voyage to Europe and war service. On 24 April, she departed New York for Europe, as the flagship of Commander Joseph K. Taussig, commanding Division 8, Destroyer Force, the first six-ship destroyer division dispatched to United Kingdom.

Wadsworths first summer overseas proved to be the most eventful period of her wartime service. She sighted her first U-boat on 18 May, less than two weeks after she began patrols out of Queenstown. Though the destroyer sped to the attack, the submarine dove and escaped. On 7 June, the destroyer caught a glimpse of another enemy submarine just before it submerged and escaped. Between 24 and 27 June, Wadsworth served as part of the escort for the first American troop convoy to reach Europe. Though she scored no definitely provable successes against German submarines, the destroyer made depth charge attacks on four separate occasions in July and a gunfire attack in one other instance. The first two depth-charge attacks, on 10 and 11 July, returned no results whatsoever, and the gun attack on 20 July was similarly unrewarding. However, after sighting a double periscope the following day, Wadsworth made another depth-charge attack. During that attack, one of the explosions seemed much stronger than those from the other charges she dropped. Moreover, a patch of reddish-brown material rose to the surface. Although it seemed certain that the destroyer had damaged a submarine, no conclusive evidence was found to prove this possibility.

Wadsworth made her fourth depth charge attack on a U-boat on 29 July. At about 17:25, she dropped several charges in what appeared to be the wake of a submarine proceeding submerged. The conjecture that a U-boat was damaged was supported by the appearance of a large amount of heavy oil on the surface following the attack. Just before 23:00, the warship attacked another supposed submarine wake. It was too dark to evaluate the results; but, not long thereafter,  struck a submerged metallic object which caused her to list 10° temporarily. Later, Wadsworths wireless operator intercepted messages sent by a German submarine over a period of about half an hour which suggested that Wadsworth may have damaged a submarine, although as with the depth-charge attack of 21 June, no definite proof was forthcoming. Early in August, the destroyer concluded her summer of peak activity by escorting the first United States merchant convoy on the last leg of its voyage to Europe. During the mission, on the 16th, the destroyer dropped a barrage on what was thought to be a submarine.

For the remainder of the war, her encounters with the enemy were infrequent. In fact, her next submarine contact did not occur until 17 December and, like those before, resulted in no definite damage to the enemy. Although the opening months of 1918 brought no new U-boat contacts, Wadsworth worked hard escorting convoys and patrolling British waters.

Early in March 1918, she received a change in assignment. On the 4th, she arrived in Brest, France, whence she operated for the remainder of the war. During that assignment, she recorded only two scrapes with German submarines: the first on 1 June and the second on 25 October. In each case, she dropped depth charges, but could produce no solid proof of damage to the enemy. The war ended on 11 November 1918 when Germany accepted Allied armistice terms.

Later career 
[[File:Curtiss NC-4 four engine configuration-detail.jpg|thumb|right|Wadsworth served as a plane guard for the 1919 transatlantic flight attempt by NC-4, a Curtiss NC flying boat.]]
On 31 December 1918, Wadsworth stood out of Brest to return to the United States and reached Boston, Massachusetts, on 9 January 1919. Following an extended overhaul, she put to sea on 1 May to serve as one of the picket ships stationed at intervals across the ocean for the transatlantic flight of four Curtiss NC flying boats, one of which, NC-4, successfully completed the feat. The destroyer returned home and operated on the east coast through the summer of 1919. On 29 August, Wadsworth was placed in reduced commission at Philadelphia where she remained almost two years. On 9 May 1921, the destroyer returned to active service along the east coast.

Just over a year later, on 3 June 1922, Wadsworth'' was decommissioned at the Philadelphia Navy Yard. The ship remained in reserve there until 7 January 1936 when her name was struck from the Naval Vessel Register. She was sold for scrapping on 30 June 1936 and was broken up the following August.

Notes

References

Bibliography

External links 
 

 

Tucker-class destroyers
Ships built in Bath, Maine
1915 ships
World War I destroyers of the United States